The 1997–98 Eredivisie season was the 38th season of the Eredivisie, the top level of ice hockey in the Netherlands. Seven teams participated in the league, and the Nijmegen Tigers won the championship.

Regular season

Playoffs

5th place round

Final for 5th place 
 Eindhoven Kemphanen - H.IJ.S. Hoky Den Haag 0:3 (4:8, 3:6, 1:6)

External links 
 Season on hockeyarchives.info

Neth
Eredivisie (ice hockey) seasons
Ere 
Ere